Bernita Sims was the mayor of High Point, North Carolina. She was elected November 6, 2012 with 33% of the vote. Sims, a Democrat, was the city's first African American mayor. On November 18, 2013, Sims was indicted by a Guilford County grand jury for allegedly writing a worthless $7,000 check. She resigned on September 10, 2014 after pleading guilty to a felony worthless check charge.

Criminal charges and resignation
On November 18, 2013, Sims was indicted by a Guilford County grand jury for allegedly writing a worthless $7,000 check as part of an estate settlement. The bill of indictment said Sims “unlawfully, willfully, and feloniously did draw, make, utter or issue and deliver to [Annie Ponce]” a check from a First Bank account in High Point that Sims “knew at the time … did not have sufficient funds on deposit with the bank with which to pay the check.” On November 19, 2013, Sims turned herself in at the High Point magistrate’s office. She was later released by the magistrate on a $10,000 unsecured bond.

On September 10, 2014 Mayor Bernita Sims pleaded guilty to a felony worthless check charge and resigned as mayor. She was sentenced to a four to 14-month suspended sentence and five years probation and was fined $500. According to her attorney, Sims had already made a $7,000 restitution payment. Mayor Pro Tem Jim Davis assumed Sims's duties as mayor for the remainder of her term. On November 4, 2014, Bill Bencini was elected as her successor.

References

External links

2012 Campaign website

People from High Point, North Carolina
Living people
North Carolina Democrats
African-American people in North Carolina politics
Women mayors of places in North Carolina
North Carolina politicians convicted of crimes
University of the District of Columbia alumni
University of North Carolina at Wilmington alumni
Year of birth missing (living people)
21st-century African-American people
21st-century African-American women
African-American mayors in North Carolina
African-American women mayors